Gain is an EP released by Sadie on December 30, 2009. It was released in 2 editions, a regular edition with the bonus track 'Regret' and a limited edition with a DVD containing the music video for 'ever' and also a slipcase.

Track listing
"ever" – 4:58
"brain core" – 4:39
"Beauty Shadow" – 4:41
"CHAOTIC WORLD" – 3:30
"愛しさは孤独の支配者 [Itoshi sa ha Kodoku no Shihai Sha]" — 4:44
"Regret" – 4:44

Personnel
Mao – vocals
Mizuki – guitar
Tsurugi – guitar
Aki – bass guitar
Kei – drums

Sadie (band) albums
2009 EPs